Frank J. Murray (February 12, 1885 – September 12, 1951) was an American football and basketball coach.   He served as the head football coach at Marquette University from 1922 to 1936 and again from 1946 to 1949, and at the University of Virginia from 1937 to 1945, compiling a career college football record of 145–89–1.  Murray was also the head basketball coach at Marquette from 1920 to 1929, tallying a mark of 94–73.  Murray was inducted into the College Football Hall of Fame in 1983.

Coaching career

Marquette
Murray was the 13th head football coach at Marquette University in Milwaukee, Wisconsin.  He held that position for nineteen seasons, from 1922 until 1936, and then returned for four more, from 1946 until 1949. His coaching record at Marquette was 104–55–6, ranking him first in school history in wins and eighth in winning percentage (.648).  In 1937, he took led Marquette to the Cotton Bowl Classic.

Murray was also basketball coach at Marquette for nine seasons (1920–1929) and compiled a record of 94–73 (.563). His best team was the 1922–23 squad, which posted a 19–2 record.

Virginia
Murray later served as the head football coach at the University of Virginia from 1937 to 1945. He compiled a 41–34–5 (.544) record during his tenure.  His best season came in 1941, when his Cavaliers went 8–1.

Head coaching record

Football

See also
 List of college football head coaches with non-consecutive tenure

References

External links
 
 

1885 births
1951 deaths
College men's basketball head coaches in the United States
Basketball coaches from Massachusetts
Marquette Golden Avalanche football coaches
Marquette Golden Eagles men's basketball coaches
Virginia Cavaliers football coaches
College Football Hall of Fame inductees
People from Maynard, Massachusetts
Sportspeople from Middlesex County, Massachusetts